The 1968 United States presidential election in Kentucky took place on November 5, 1968. All 50 states and the District of Columbia were part of the 1968 United States presidential election. Kentucky voters chose 9 electors to the Electoral College, which selected the president and vice president of the United States.

Former Vice President Richard Nixon, the Republican nominee, won the state with 462,411 votes and 43.79 percent of the vote, with Vice President Hubert Humphrey, the Democratic nominee, taking 397,541 votes and 37.65 percent of the vote, followed by American Party candidate George Wallace, who took 193,098 votes and 18.29 percent of the vote.

Results

Results by county

Notes

References

Kentucky
1968
1968 Kentucky elections